The 4th Artillery Regiment or RA4 (Regimento de Artilharia n.º 4 in Portuguese) OTE is a base unit of the Portuguese Army, stationed in Leiria. Presently, the RA4 is dependent on the Rapid Reaction Brigade, whose charges towards Operating System Component Forces.

History
1917 - The current RA4 was created in  Castelo Branco as the Field Howitzers Regiment or ROC (Regimento de Obuses de Campanha) through the integration of the old field howitzer battalions from 5th Artillery Regiment from Viana do Castelo and from the 6th Artillery Regiment from Porto.
1926 - The ROC was transferred to Leiria, being renamed 4th Artillery Regiment or RA4.
1927 - The unit was renamed 4th Light Artillery Regiment or RAL4 (Regimento de Artilharia Ligeira n.º 4).
1955 - The regiment received the task of organizing the divisional artillery headquarters and two of the three field artillery groups (battalions) of the 3rd Division of the Portuguese Expeditionary Corps, the Portuguese main land forces contribution to NATO.
1961 - With the beginning of the Portuguese Colonial War, the regiment organizes and sends, to Angola, three artillery companies (caçadores type), to act as infantry but composed of military gunners: the 101st, the 119th and the 178th artillery companies.
1963 - The RAL4, while retaining the same name, becomes a training center for military secretariat, especially for personal to be deployed to the Portuguese overseas territories in Africa.
1975 - The unit is renamed Artillery Regiment of Leiria or RAL (Regimento de Artilharia de Leiria). Since 1977, the RAL receives the task of organizing the Field Artillery Group (GAC) of the new 1st Independent Mixed Brigade. For that task it is equipped with 155 mm M109 self-propelled and with M101 towed 105 mm howitzers.
1993 - The unit is again renamed "4th Artillery Regiment" being responsible for the organization and maintenance of the Field Artillery Group of the Independent Airborne Brigade, equipped with M101 and later with M119 Light Gun howitzers.
2005 - As part of the reorganization of the Portuguese Army, the Rapid Reaction Brigade (ex-Airborne Brigade) ceased to have organic field artillery, and its Field Artillery Group is transferred to the Intervention Brigade (BrigInt). Following this reorganization, given the deactivation of the old BrigInt's artillery unit, the RA4's Field Artillery Group's became the sole towed field artillery operational unit of the Portuguese Army.
2009 - The 5th Artillery Regiment raised a new Field Artillery Group, which is attributed to the BrigInt. The RA4's Field Artillery Group is re-integrated in the Rapid Reaction Brigade.

Equipment
Infantry equipment
 Glock 17 Gen 5
 FN SCAR L STD
FN Minimi Mk3
Browning M2
FN40GL Grenade launcher
L16A2 mortar
Carl Gustav M3

Artillery
 L118 light gun
 Ordnance QF 25-pounder (used on ceremonial roles)

Tactical vehicles
 Mitsubishi L200 4x4
Land Rover Defender'90 TDI 4x4
Toyota Land Cruiser HZJ73

Transport vehicles
 Iveco 40.10 WM
Iveco 90.17 WM
DAF YA 4440 D
Unimog U1100L
Unimog 1750L
MAN 10.224

Awards and decorations
 2 Decorations of Officer of the Military Order of the Tower and Sword of Valour, Loyalty and Merit
 3 1st Class Honours War Cross
 Gold Distinguished Service Medal
 Gold Medal of the City

 Gallery 

References

Sources
Regimento de Artilharia n.º 4 - translatedhttp://www.exercito.pt/SITES/RA4/Paginas/default.aspx  - translatedhttps://web.archive.org/web/20150924020310/http://www.g-sat.net/showthread.php?444233-Historia-Regimento-de-Artilharia-n%C2%BA-4-(Leiria) - translated''

1917 establishments in Portugal
Military units and formations established in 1917
1927 establishments in Portugal
Military units and formations established in 1927
Army regiments of Portugal
Military of Portugal
Military installations in Portugal